Shui Long Wo is an area of Hong Kong, part of Kei Ling Ha, in the eastern New Territories of Hong Kong. Administratively, it is part of Tai Po District. The end of Stage 3 and start of Stage 4 of the MacLehose Trail is located at Shui Long Wo.

Features
A barbecue area and a campsite are located at Shui Long Wo.

The Shui Long Wo Star Lookout, a 6-metre-high stone structure, is a replica of the Gaocheng Astronomical Observatory.

See also
 List of gaps in Hong Kong

References

Sai Kung Peninsula
Tai Po District